David Lawson may refer to:
 David J. Lawson (1930–2007), American pastor
 David M. Lawson (born 1951), American judge
 David Lawson (politician), Scottish-Canadian politician
 David Lawson (footballer) (born 1947), former football goalkeeper
 Dave Lawson (born 1978), Australian comedian
 David G. Lawson (born 1946), member of the Delaware Senate